The 40th NAACP Image Awards ceremony, presented by the National Association for the Advancement of Colored People (NAACP), honored the best in film, television, music of 2008 and took place on February 12, 2009 at the Shrine Auditorium. The show was televised live on Fox and hosted by Halle Berry and Tyler Perry.

This event celebrated the 100th anniversary of the NAACP.

Winners

Motion Picture

Outstanding Motion Picture
The Secret Life of Bees
Cadillac Records
The Family That Preys
Miracle at St. Anna
Seven Pounds

Outstanding Actor in a Motion Picture
Will Smith - Seven Pounds 
Rob Brown-The Express: The Ernie Davis Story 
Don Cheadle- TraitorOutstanding Actress: Rosario Dawson - Seven PoundsOutstanding Supporting Actor: Columbus Short - Cadillac RecordsOutstanding Supporting Actress: Taraji P. Henson - The Curious Case of Benjamin ButtonOutstanding Independent or Foreign Film: Slumdog MillionaireOutstanding Documentary:Good Hair''

Music awards
Outstanding Album: Jennifer Hudson - Jennifer Hudson
Outstanding Male Artist: Jamie Foxx
Outstanding Female Artist: Beyonce
Outstanding New Artist: Jennifer Hudson
Outstanding Duo, Group, or Collaboration: Jennifer Hudson and Fantasia Barrino
Outstanding Song: Yes We Can by will.i.am

References

External links
Official site
Nominees

40
N
N
N